Buddleja colvilei is endemic to the eastern Himalaya; discovered by Hooker in 1849, he declared it 'the handsomest of all Himalayan shrubs.'  In 1896 the species was awarded the RHS First Class Certificate (FCC), given to plants 'of outstanding excellence for exhibition'.

Description
B. colvilei is a deciduous large shrub or small tree which can grow > 13 m, often single stemmed. The flowers are arranged in drooping panicles, 15–20 cm long by > 8 cm wide, rose pink to crimson, but often white within the corolla tube. The flowers are among the largest of any in the genus, and appear in June. The leaves are < 25 cm long, narrow, shallowly - toothed, and tapered at either end.  This species has a high degree of polyploidy with a correspondingly high chromosome number of  2n = 152–456 (8x–24x).

Cultivation
The shrub is not entirely hardy in the UK, and can only be reliably grown outdoors along the Atlantic coast. Hardiness: United States Department of Agriculture zones 8–9.

Cultivars
Buddleja colvilei 'Kewensis', distinguished by its dark red flowers.

References

Leeuwenberg, A. J. M. (1979) The Loganiaceae of Africa XVIII Buddleja L. II, Revision of the African & Asiatic species. H. Veenman & Zonen, Wageningen, Nederland.
Phillips, R. & Rix, M. (1989). Shrubs, Pan Books, London.
Li, P. T. & Leeuwenberg, A. J. M. (1996). Loganiaceae, in Wu, Z. & Raven, P. (eds) Flora of China, Vol. 15. Science Press, Beijing, and Missouri Botanical Garden Press, St. Louis, USA.  online at www.efloras.org

colvilei
Flora of East Himalaya
Taxa named by Joseph Dalton Hooker